Firoza may refer to:

 Firoza, is a City of Rahim Yar Khan, Pakistan
 Firoza Begum (actress)
 Firoza Begum (singer)